Cassie Powney (born 22 May 1983) is an English actress, known for portraying the role of Mel Burton on the Channel 4 soap opera Hollyoaks.

Career 
She played the role of Mel Burton in the soap opera Hollyoaks alongside her sister Connie, who played the role of Sophie Burton. She has been interested in acting since childhood and did a lot of twin roles with Connie, including a twin role in the 2003 film What a Girl Wants. She is now a beauty correspondent for Cosmopolitan.

Filmography

References

External links 
 

1983 births
British identical twins
English television actresses
English child actresses
Living people
English twins
Identical twin actresses
People from Seaford, East Sussex
English soap opera actresses